Miss Ecuador 2014, the 64st Miss Ecuador pageant, was held on March 15, 2014. Constanza Báez from Pichincha crowned her successor Alejandra Argudo from Manabí as Miss Ecuador 2014. It was broadcast on Gama TV.

The winner represented Ecuador at Miss Universe 2014, while the first runner-up participated in Miss International 2014 and the second runner-up competed in Miss Supranational 2014. The other finalists entered in various minor international pageants.

Although it was planned to be streamed over Xbox Live to Ecuadorian communities abroad, this arrangement was cancelled to avoid interrupting Titanfall players from their games.

Results

Placements

Special Awards

Best National Costume

Contestants

Notes

Debuts

 Orellana
 Sucumbíos

Returns

Last compete in:

2012 
 Azuay
 Esmeraldas
 Santa Elena

Withdraws

 Galapagos
 Los Ríos

References

External links
Official Miss Ecuador website

2014 beauty pageants
Beauty pageants in Ecuador
Miss Ecuador